The Jebel Mokram Group was a prehistoric, neolithic culture that flourished in the second millennium BC in the West of the Sudan and in western Eritrea. The culture appeared around 1800 and followed the Gash Group.

So far, the culture is little researched and is mainly known from a few archaeological sites. The Jebel Mokram Group is characterized by its pottery. Thick and round vessel rims are typical. Vessels are often decorated with an incised net pattern. Similar pottery is known from the Pan-grave people of Sudan and Egypt and also from the Kerma culture.  Different types of stone tools were used. Fragments of Egyptian pottery attest some sort of contacts with Egypt. The Jebel Mokram Group produced small clay figures of animals.  Several settlement site are known, providing evidence that the Jebel Mokram Group people lived in light huts. It seems that they were basically herdsmen.

Recent archaeological finds of Egyptian pottery in Jebel Mokram Group assemblages provide more details about contacts with Egypt. Eastern Sudan was interacting with Egypt in the second half of the third and into the second millennium BC.

References

Literature 
 

Neolithic cultures of Africa
Jebel Mokram Group
Jebel Mokram Group